Miss Europe 1958 was the 21st edition of the Miss Europe pageant and the tenth edition under the Mondial Events Organization. It was held in Istanbul, Turkey on 28 June 1958. Johanna "Hanni" Ehrenstrasser of Austria, was crowned Miss Europe 1958 by out going titleholder Corine Rottschäfer of Holland.

Results

Placements

Contestants 

 - Johanna "Hanni" Ehrenstrasser
 - Jeanine (Jeanne) Chandelle
 - Aase (Åse) Hansen
 - Dorothy Hazeldine
 - Pirkko Mannola
 - Annie Simplot
 - Dagmar Herner
 - Luciënne Struve
 - Anna Guðmundsdóttir
 - Elisabetta Rota
 - Lydie Schmitz
 - Elizabeth Tonning
 - Adela Bustillo
 - Marie-Louise Hjelm
 - Ezel Olcay

Notes

Returns

Withdrawals
 - May Cavalika (Kavami); Could not compete because the host country was Turkey and due to political tensions between Greece and Turkey over Cyprus, Greeks were forbidden from going to Turkey.

"Comité Officiel et International Miss Europe" Competition

From 1951 to 2002 there was a rival Miss Europe competition organized by the "Comité Officiel et International Miss Europe". This was founded in 1950 by Jean Raibaut in Paris, the headquarters later moved to Marseille. The winners wore different titles like Miss Europe, Miss Europa or Miss Europe International.

This year, the competition took place in Amiens, France. There were 8 delegates all from their own countries. At the end, Evelyne Ricket of France was crowned as Miss Europa 1958. Ricket succeeded predecessor Ingrid Weiss of Germany.

Placements
{| class="wikitable"
! Final results
! Contestant
|-
| Miss Europa 1958
|
 - Evelyne Ricket
|-
| 1st runner-up
| - Hajett Rekik
|}

Contestants - Hajett Rekik - Eda Prack D'Outre Mer, France - Claudie Johns - Evelyne Ricket - Giacomina Forlini - Linda Lolyi - Colette Obadia''' - Liliane Ringler

References

External links 
 

Miss Europe
1958 beauty pageants
1958 in Turkey
1958 in France